Rhodoecia is a genus of moths of the family Noctuidae.

Species
 Rhodoecia aurantiago (Guenée, 1852)

References
Natural History Museum Lepidoptera genus database
Rhodoecia at funet

Heliothinae